Giulia Volpi (born 30 January 1970) is an Italian gymnast. She competed at the 1988 Summer Olympics and the 1992 Summer Olympics.

Eponymous skill
Volpi has an eponymous skill listed in the Code of Points.

Competitive history

References

External links
 

1970 births
Living people
Italian female artistic gymnasts
Olympic gymnasts of Italy
Gymnasts at the 1988 Summer Olympics
Gymnasts at the 1992 Summer Olympics
Sportspeople from Brescia
Originators of elements in artistic gymnastics